This is a list of monuments in Balzan, Malta, which are listed on the National Inventory of the Cultural Property of the Maltese Islands.

List 

|}

References

Balzan
Balzan